Araks may refer to:

Aras River
Araks, Armavir, Armenia
Araks, Echmiadzin, Armenia
Arax (weekly), Armenian weekly in Iran